Interactive Support Group was an American game developer and console hardware manufacturer specializing in fifth generation console systems CD-I and 3DO.

Published games 
 Video Speedway (1993)

Video game companies disestablished in 1995
Defunct video game companies of the United States